Grass Eyot is an island in the River Thames in England above Maidenhead Bridge on the reach above Bray Lock, near Maidenhead, Berkshire.

Out of accordance with its name, the island is tree-covered and there is a very small island between it and Bridge Eyot just downstream.

References

See also
Islands in the River Thames

Islands of Berkshire
Islands of the River Thames
Royal Borough of Windsor and Maidenhead